Le Scorpion is a Franco-Belgian comics series written by Stephen Desberg, illustrated by Enrico Marini and published by Dargaud in French and Dutch, and by Cinebook in English.

Summary 

The story takes place in Rome during the second half of the eighteenth century. Cardinal Trebaldi decides to reinstate the power of the nine families, based on papacy. Armando Catalano, also known as The Scorpion, is a holy relics dealer. He is the son of a heretic who was burnt alive for misdirecting a priest from the church and Christian beliefs. Armando, the bearer of a birthmark in the shape of a scorpion known as the "mark of the devil", challenges the cardinal's authority. The cardinal, who seems to be filled with hatred for The Scorpion, sends the young gypsy Mejai, a specialist in poisons, to kill him.

The adventures of the Scorpion lead him to the treasure of the Templars and to discover an interpretation of what might have happened to it.  Between fiction and history, this comic distills Machiavellian theory on religious authority.

Albums 
These albums are published by Dargaud:
 La marque du diable - October 2000
 Le secret du Pape - October 2001
 La croix de Pierre - November 2002
 Le Démon au Vatican - April 2004
 La vallée sacrée - November 2004
 Le trésor du Temple - October 2005
 Au Nom du Père - November 2006
 L'ombre de l'Ange - November 2008
 Masque de la Vérité - August 2010
 Au Nom du Fils - November 2012
 La neuvième famille - November 2014
 Le Mauvais Augure - November 2019
 Tamose l’égyptien - November 2020
 La Tombe d'un dieu - May 2022

English Translation 
Since August 2008, Cinebook Ltd has been publishing The Scorpion. Eight trade paperbacks have been released, although note that the first two correspond to two each of the French albums.

 The Devil's Mark (includes The Pope's Secret)  - August 2008
 The Devil in the Vatican (includes The Stone Cross)  - May 2009
 The Holy Valley   - April 2010
 The Treasure of the Templars  - August 2010
 In the Name of the Father  - May 2012
 The Angel's Shadow  - August 2013
 The Mask of Truth  - November 2013
 In the Name of the Son  - June 2014

References

External links
Cinebook Ltd

Bandes dessinées
Belgian comic strips
Dargaud titles
Comics set in the 18th century
Fictional Italian people
1996 comics debuts
Comics characters introduced in 1996
Drama comics
Action comics
Adventure comics
Italian comics characters